A referendum on the presidential term and national and regional governors was held in Venezuela on 15 December 1957. Voters were asked whether they approved of President Marcos Pérez Jiménez remaining in power without fresh elections, and appointing government nominees as members of the national parliament, regional assemblies and local councils. Jiménez had been installed as President after the military rejected the results of the 1952 Venezuelan Constituent Assembly election. With the referendum held under non-democratic conditions, the measures were reportedly approved by 86.7% of voters.

Results

References

Referendum
Venezuela
Referendums in Venezuela